Roni da Silva Ribeiro (born 30 June 1980 in Brazil) is a Brazilian football (midfielder) player who currently plays for SG Neudorf/Parndorf.

External links
Nemzeti Sport 
HLSZ 

1980 births
Living people
Brazilian footballers
Association football midfielders
Répcelak SE players
Lombard-Pápa TFC footballers
Bajai LSE footballers
BFC Siófok players
Budaörsi SC footballers
Brazilian expatriate footballers
Expatriate footballers in Hungary
Expatriate footballers in Austria
Brazilian expatriate sportspeople in Hungary
Brazilian expatriate sportspeople in Austria